Isaiah or Yeshayahu ben Avraham Ha-Levi Horowitz, (c. 1555 – March 24, 1630), also known as the Shelah HaKaddosh ( "the holy Shelah") after the title of his best-known work, was a prominent rabbi and mystic.

Biography
Isaiah Horowitz was born in Prague around 1555. His first teacher was his father, Avraham ben Shabtai Sheftel Horowitz, a notable scholar and author, and a disciple of Moses Isserles (Rema). Horowitz studied under Meir Lublin and Joshua Falk. He married Chaya, daughter of Abraham Moul, of Vienna, and was a wealthy and active philanthropist, supporting Torah study, especially in Jerusalem. In 1590, in Lublin, he participated in a meeting of the Council of Four Lands, and his signature appears on a decree that condemns the purchase of rabbinic positions.

In 1602, Isaiah Horowitz was appointed Av Beit Din in Austria, and in 1606 was appointed Rabbi of Frankfurt. In 1614, after serving as rabbi in prominent cities in Europe, he left following the Fettmilch Uprising and assumed the prestigious position of chief rabbi of Prague.

In 1621, after the death of his wife, he moved to Israel, was appointed rabbi of the Ashkenazi community in Jerusalem, and married Hava, daughter of Eleazer. In 1625, he was kidnapped and imprisoned, together with 15 other Jewish rabbis and scholars, by the Pasha (Ibn Faruh) and held for ransom. After 1626, Horowitz moved to Safed, erstwhile home of Kabbalah, and later died in Tiberias on March 24, 1630 (Nisan 11, 5390 on the Hebrew calendar).

In his many kabbalistic, homiletic and halachic works, he stressed the joy in every action, and how one should convert the evil inclination into good, two concepts that influenced Jewish thought through to the eighteenth-century, and greatly influenced the development of Hasidic Judaism.

Famous descendants of Isaiah Horowitz included Yaakov Yitzchak of Lublin (known as  "The Seer of Lublin"), the prominent Billiczer rabbinical family of Szerencs, Hungary and the Dym family of rabbis and communal leaders in Galicia, Aaron HaLevi ben Moses of Staroselye (a prominent student of Shneur Zalman of Liadi), the Fruchter-Langer families and Rabbi Meir Zelig Mann of Memel, Lithuania (b. 1921, d. 2008).

Works
His most important work Shenei Luḥot HaBerit (Two Tablets of the Covenant, abbreviated Shelah ), is an encyclopedic compilation of ritual, ethics, and mysticism. It was originally intended as an ethical will - written as a compendium of the Jewish religion. The title page of the first edition states that the work is "compiled from both Torahs, Written and Oral, handed down from Sinai". The work has had a profound influence on Jewish life - notably, on the early Hasidic movement, including the Baal Shem Tov; Shneur Zalman of Liadi was described as a "Shelah Yid", and Shelah clearly echoes in his work, Tanya. The work was first published in 1648 by his son, Shabbethai Horowitz, and has been often reprinted, especially in an abbreviated form. (See also שני לוחות הברית article in the Hebrew Wikipedia).

Horowitz also wrote the Sha'ar ha-Shamayim siddur (prayer book) which had an influence on the later Ashkenazi nusach.

Tefillat HaShlah - The Shelah's Prayer
Rabbi Horowitz wrote that the eve of the first day of the month of Sivan is the most auspicious time to pray for the physical and spiritual welfare of one's children and grandchildren, since Sivan was the month that the Torah was given to the Jewish people. He composed a special prayer to be said on this day, known as the Tefillat HaShlah "the Shelah's Prayer". In modern times, the custom of saying this prayer on the appointed day has become very popular among Orthodox parents.

Burial place
He is buried in HaRambam compound / complex in Tiberias / Tveria.

Other notable rabbis also buried in HaRambam compound / complex:
 Maimonides
 Eliezer ben Hurcanus
 Yohanan ben Zakkai
 Joshua ben Hananiah

Footnotes

External links

Sources

Short biography of Rabbi Isaiah Halevi Horowitz (The Shelah), chabad.org
Rabbi Isaiah ben Avraham Ha-Levi Horowitz (The Shelah), ou.org
Rabbi Isaiah ben Avraham Ha-Levi Horowitz (The Shelah), jewishvirtuallibrary.org
Rabbi Isaiah HaLevi Horowitz –The Shelah, meaningfullife.com
Rabbi Yishayahu ben Avraham Ha-Levi Horowitz, horwitzfam.org
Tefillat HaShlah Custom in Modern Life, mavenmall.com

Resources
Shney Luchot Habrit: fulltext download (Hebrew), seforimonline.org
"Shney Luchot Habrit", Translator Rabbi Eliyahu Munk, Urim Publications 2000. 
 Isaiah Horowitz: The Generations of Adam. Ed. by Miles Krassen. New York 1996.
Text of Tefillat HaShlah (Hebrew), he.wikisource

Literature
"Life and teachings of Isaiah Horowitz", Rabbi Dr. E. Newman, Judaica Press 1972. 

1550s births
1630 deaths

Year of birth uncertain
Rabbis from Prague
17th-century Bohemian rabbis
17th-century German rabbis
Rabbis in Safed
Ashkenazi rabbis in Ottoman Palestine
Kabbalists
Authors of books on Jewish law
Rabbis from Frankfurt
17th-century rabbis from the Ottoman Empire